95.9 Green FM (DWSU 95.9 MHz) is an FM station owned and operated by De La Salle University - Dasmariñas. Its studios and transmitter are located inside the DLSU-D Campus, West Ave., Dasmariñas.

References

External links
 

College radio stations in the Philippines
Radio stations in Cavite
Radio stations established in 2005